Marie-Victoire Jaquotot (15 January 1772 – 27 April 1855) was a 19th-century French painter.

Biography
Jaquotot was born in Paris and became a painter for the porcelain factory at Sèvres. She is known for her miniatures and in 1813-1814 she painted a likeness of Napoleon on porcelain which he purchased as a gift for Josephine. From 1816-1836 she ran a school from her Paris workshop in porcelain painting and one of her pupils was Charles Le Guay, who took over her workshop.

Jaquotot died in Toulouse.

Gallery

References

External links

Marie-Victoire Jaquotot on artnet

1772 births
1855 deaths
Painters from Paris
19th-century French painters
French women painters
19th-century French women artists